Narvesus is a genus of assassin bugs in the family Reduviidae. There are at least two described species in Narvesus.

Species
These two species belong to the genus Narvesus:
 Narvesus carolinensis Stål, 1859
 Narvesus minor Barber, 1930

References

Further reading

 
 

Reduviidae
Articles created by Qbugbot